Cecchini is an Italian surname from Umbria. Notable people with the surname include:

Antonio Cecchini (born 1660), Italian painter of the Baroque period
Dario Cecchini (born 1955), Italian butcher
Dave Cecchini, American college football player and coach
Elena Cecchini (born 1992), Italian racing cyclist
Emanuel Cecchini (born 1996), Argentine footballer 
Garin Cecchini (born 1991), American baseball player in Major League Baseball, brother of Gavin Cecchini
Gavin Cecchini (born 1993), American baseball player, brother of Garin Cecchini
Graziano Cecchini (born 1953), Italian artist and activist 
Jessica Cecchini (born 1990), Italian beauty pageant winner
José Antonio Cecchini (born 1955), retired Spanish wrestler
Joseph Luke Cecchini (born 1982), Italian skeleton racer 
Sandra Cecchini (born 1965), Italian tennis player
Loris Cecchini (born 1969), Italian contemporary artist
Luca Cecchini (born 1993), Italian footballer 
Luigi Cecchini (born 1944), Italian sports doctor
Mario Cecchini (1933–2021), Italian Roman Catholic bishop
Michele Cecchini (1920–1989), Vatican diplomat
Ramon Cecchini (born 1990), Swiss footballer
Russell Cecchini, paralympic athlete from Canada 
Silvia Cecchini (born 1994), Italian professional racing cyclist
Tom Cecchini (born 1944), American football player and coach

See also
13798 Cecchini, an asteroid
Cecchino (disambiguation)

Italian-language surnames